Neptis constantiae, or Constance's sailer, is a butterfly in the family Nymphalidae. It is found in Nigeria, Cameroon, the Democratic Republic of the Congo, Uganda, Kenya and Tanzania. The habitat consists of forests.

Subspecies
Neptis constantiae constantiae (Uganda, western Kenya, north-western Tanzania)
Neptis constantiae kaumba Condamin, 1966 (Nigeria, Cameroon, Democratic Republic of the Congo: Lualaba and Sankuru)

References

Butterflies described in 1961
constantiae